Sarygamyş Sanctuary is a sanctuary (zakaznik) of Turkmenistan.

It is part of Gaplaňgyr Nature Reserve. It was established for the protection of beaches of Sarygamyş Lake, flying natatorial birds and lambing places of gazelles.

External links
 Government-designated nature reserves of Turkmenistan

Sanctuaries in Turkmenistan